69 and Dead is a 2015 Irish short drama film directed and written by Ellen Bytyki. It was featured in the 2015 Galway Film Fleadh.

The film stars Emmet Byrne as Daniel, a young man who inadvertently causes the death of his grandfather (Frank Kelly) while trying to spice up his grandfather's relationship with his grandmother (Máirín O'Donovan).

Cast
 Emmet Byrne as Daniel
 Máirín O'Donovan as Rita
 Frank Kelly as Eamon
 Irene Byrne as Patricia
 Elisabeth Lloyd as Phyllis
 Jack Maher as Peter

References

External links
 

Irish short films
English-language Irish films
2010s English-language films